In the  education system of New Zealand, a wānanga is a  publicly-owned tertiary institution that provides education in a Māori cultural context. Section 162 of the New Zealand Education Act of 1989 specifies that wānanga resemble mainstream  universities in many ways but expects them to be:
"... characterised by teaching and research that maintains, advances, and disseminates knowledge and develops intellectual independence, and assists the application of knowledge regarding ahuatanga Maori (Maori tradition) according to  tikanga Maori (Maori custom)."

Wānanga educational programmes, accredited through the New Zealand Qualifications Authority (NZQA) and through the Ministry of Education, are partly governed by New Zealand's  Tertiary Education Commission (TEC). Wānanga offer certificates, diplomas, and  bachelor-level degrees, with some wānanga providing programmes in specialized areas up to doctorate level.

Outside the 21st-century formal education system, the word wānanga in the Māori language traditionally conveys meanings related to highly evolved knowledge, lore, occult arts,
and also "forum" - in the sense of a discussion to arrive at deeper understanding.

The term "Whare Wānanga" is also widely used in the Māori names of New Zealand universities (e.g., Te Whare Wānanga o Waikato/University of Waikato).

Recognised wānanga
 Te Wānanga o Raukawa, founded in 1981 and based in Ōtaki 
 Te Wānanga o Aotearoa, founded in 1984, operating nationwide and headquartered in Te Awamutu
 Te Whare Wānanga o Awanuiārangi, founded in 1991 and based in Whakatāne

See also
 Tribal colleges and universities – United States

References